Namasagali College is a mixed boarding middle and high school located in Kamuli District in Eastern Uganda.

Location
The school campus sits on the eastern shores of the Victoria Nile, between Lake Victoria and Lake Kyoga. The coordinates of the college campus are: Latitude:1.0118N; Longitude:32.9490E.

History
Namasagali College was established in 1965, as Kamuli College, located in Kamuli, at the premises now occupied by Busoga High School. Later that same year the school was relocated to its present premises and renamed "Namasagali College". In the beginning, the school was a joint venture between the Busoga Kingdom and the Mill Hill Fathers of the Roman Catholic Church. Busoga provided the infrastructure, while the Catholic Church provided administrative leadership. The first two headteachers were Mill Hill Fathers: Father Navel (1965–1966) and Father Damian Grimes (1967–2000). This arrangement was terminated in 2001, following the departure of Father Grimes; the school became a public school, under the administration of the Ministry of Education.

Reputation
During the 1960s through the early 1980s Namasagali College was a prestigious middle and high school, sought after by the best students in Uganda. Over the years, the school has fallen into physical disrepair and its academic performance has declined. There are current efforts by the students alumni association; Namasagali Students Association (NOSA) to revive the school infrastructure and improve academic performance.

Academics
The college offers both "Ordinaly Level" (O Level) and "Advanced Level" (A Level) classes.

Notable alumni
Notable alumni of Namasagali College include the following:
 Isaac Musumba – Uganda's former State Minister for Regional Foreign Affairs, 2006–2011
 Rebecca Kadaga – Speaker of the Ugandan Parliament, 2001–2011, Speaker of the Ugandan Parliament, 2011 to Date
 Miria Matembe – Uganda Minister of Ethics and Integrity, 1998–2003
 Charles Mbire – Chairman MTN Uganda and Eskom Uganda
 Juliana Kanyomozi – Ugandan recording artist
 Patrick Bitature – Ugandan entrepreneur, businessman and hotelier
 Iryn Namubiru – Ugandan-born, performing artist, resident of Paris, France

See also
 Education in Uganda
 Kamuli District

External links
 Location of Namasagali College At Google Maps
 The Memoires of Father Damian Grimes, Headmaster of Namasagali College from 1967 to 2000

References

Boarding schools in Uganda
Educational institutions established in 1965
Mixed schools in Uganda
Kamuli District
1965 establishments in Uganda